Colorado Rapids U–23 were an American soccer team based in the Denver suburb of Commerce City, Colorado, United States. Originally founded in 2000 as part of the development system for the Colorado Rapids, the team played in the Premier Development League, the fourth tier of the American Soccer Pyramid.

Year-by-year

Honors
 USL PDL Mountain Division Champions 2018
 USL PDL Heartland Division Champions 2005, 2006

Coaches
  Mike Seabolt (2002–2003)
  Peter Ambrose (2004–2008)
  Chris Martinez (2017)
  Erik Bushey (2018)

Stadium

 Pleasant View Field, Boulder, Colorado (2003–2008)
 Dick's Sporting Goods Park Field #20, Commerce City, Colorado (2017–2018)

References

External links
 
 Official PDL site

Colorado Rapids
Reserve soccer teams in the United States
Defunct Premier Development League teams
2000 establishments in Colorado
2008 disestablishments in Colorado
Association football clubs established in 2000
Association football clubs disestablished in 2008
Sports in Boulder, Colorado